The Tinkling Symbol, first published in 1935, is a detective story by Phoebe Atwood Taylor which features her series detective Asey Mayo, the "Codfish Sherlock".  This novel is a mystery of the type known as a whodunnit.

Plot summary

The little Cape Cod town of West Weesit has been rocked by four suicides from the same location, now known as "Suicide Cliff".  Last month, Kay Truman was the latest body to be found at the foot of the cliff.  Her father, Dave, had already been depressed because his business had failed and his wife had left him.  A number of witnesses in a neighboring house see him come out on the porch with a gun and aim it at himself, and they assume the resulting shot is another suicide.  But when it is learned that Dave had in fact been stabbed in the back, Asey Mayo takes a hand and soon becomes a target for a determined shooter.  In between, he sorts out some local Cape Cod entanglements and learns the meaning of a dying clue left by Dave Truman -- "ink"—and what the tinkling bell around the neck of Sully the cat has to do with anything.

1935 American novels
Novels by Phoebe Atwood Taylor
Novels set on Cape Cod and the Islands
W. W. Norton & Company books